God Leaves (And Dies) is the debut EP by Swiss industrial metal band Apollyon Sun, released in 1997 via Mayan Records.

"God Leaves" and "The Cane" were taken from the band's 1997 Industry Demonstration and were remastered for this release. Written, arranged and  produced by Apollyon Sun. Recorded at Greenwood Studios, Nunningen, Switzerland, and Artag Studio, Zurich, Switzerland, January 1998.

"Concrete Satan" includes samples from the film Scared Straight! (1980).

Track listing
"God Leaves" – 4:30
"Reefer Boy" – 4:58
"The Cane" – 4:35
"Concrete Satan" – 3:47
"Bedlam and Blind" – 4:20
"Female Flight Attendant" - 5:37

Personnel
Tom Gabriel Fischer – vocals, guitars
Erol Unala – guitars
Roger Muller – synthesizer, programming
Danny Zingg – bass
Marky Edelmann – drums

Apollyon Sun albums
1998 debut EPs